In 1953, the Public Safety Act was enacted by the apartheid South African government (coming into force 4 March). This Act empowered the government to declare stringent states of emergency and increased penalties for protesting against or supporting the repeal of a law.

This act was passed in response to civil disobedience campaigns by the African National Congress (ANC), in particular the Defiance Campaign of 1952 (instigated by ANC leaders, including Nelson Mandela and Walter Sisulu).

The Act included a provision that empowered the government to declare a state of emergency in any or every part of the country (South West Africa included) and to rule by proclamation. Under Section 3, this power was granted to the Governor General (and later, the State President), and it effectively put no limits on what measures might be taken, or for how long.

Moreover, any law issued during a state of emergency could be made retrospective for four days to cover any emergency action taken by the police. The emergency regulations could suspend any act of Parliament, with a few exceptions. If the justice minister or administrator of South West Africa deemed it necessary, they could declare a state of emergency but the governor general had to approve their action within ten days.

Under a state of emergency, the Minister of Law and Order, the Commissioner of the South African Police (SAP), a magistrate, or a commissioned officer  could detain any person for "reasons of public safety". The Public Safety Act, further provided for detention without trial for any dissent.

Repeal
The Act was repealed by the State of Emergency Act No 86 of 1995.

See also
 :Category:Apartheid laws in South Africa
 Apartheid in South Africa

References

External links
 African History: Apartheid Legislation in South Africa

Apartheid laws in South Africa
1953 in South African law